is a national university in Katō, Hyōgo, Japan, founded as "New Concept University" of Teacher Education for Undergraduate and Graduate in 1978.

Graduate School satellite campus in Kobe was established in 2000.

See also 
 Darryl Takizo Yagi
 Japanese national university
 Vanderbilt University's Peabody College of education - Cooperative relationship
 University of Wisconsin - Eau Claire - Academic exchange
 Seoul National University of Education - Academic exchange
 Daegu National University of Education - Academic exchange

References

External links
 Official website

Educational institutions established in 1978
Japanese national universities
Universities and colleges in Hyōgo Prefecture
1978 establishments in Japan
Teachers colleges in Japan
Katō, Hyōgo